Go for It is a British game show that was broadcast on ITV in 2016 for one series and was hosted by Stephen Mulhern.

The series returned on 10 December 2016 for a one-off special, with members of the public who thought they could do better than the previous acts. Some new challenges were also included.

Format
The programme sees challengers putting their unusual skills and implausible party tricks to the test. If the challenger succeeds, they win £1,000.

Background
The show's format is adapted from Challenge Me!, which has been produced in the United States, Netherlands and Ukraine. In May 2016, it was announced that ITV had commissioned a new skill game show titled Go for it!, based on the television series Challenge Me!. ITV used application forms under the working title Challenge Me!, with the title being changed in May 2016.

References

External links

2016 British television series debuts
2016 British television series endings
2010s British game shows
English-language television shows
ITV game shows
Television series by ITV Studios